Yungay may refer to the following places:

Chile
Yungay, Chile, a town in the Ñuble Region
Barrio Yungay, a neighborhood of Santiago, Chile
Yungay, the driest place on earth, in Antofagasta Region

Peru
Yungay, Peru
Yungay District
Yungay Province